Aniello Campagna (1607–1648) was a Roman Catholic prelate who served as Bishop of Nusco (1645–1648).

Biography
Aniello Campagna was born in 1607 in Naples, Italy.
On 6 Mar 1645, he was appointed during the papacy of Pope Innocent X as Bishop of Nusco.
On 19 Mar 1645, he was consecrated bishop by Ciriaco Rocci, Cardinal-Priest of San Salvatore in Lauro, with Alfonso Sacrati, Bishop Emeritus of Comacchio, and Ranuccio Scotti Douglas, Bishop of Borgo San Donnino, serving as co-consecrators. 
He served as Bishop of Nusco until his death in Jan 1648.

References

External links and additional sources
 (for Chronology of Bishops) 
 (for Chronology of Bishops) 

1607 births
1648 deaths
17th-century Neapolitan people
17th-century Italian Roman Catholic bishops
Bishops appointed by Pope Innocent X